Events in the year 2016 in Paraguay.

Incumbents
 President: Horacio Cartes

Events
1 October – the Miss Universo Paraguay 2016 pageant

Sport
5-21 August – Paraguay at the 2016 Summer Olympics: 11 competitors in 7 sports

Deaths
8 January – Carlos Milcíades Villalba Aquino, Roman Catholic bishop (b. 1924).

23 January – Pablo Contessi, physician and politician.

29 March – Oscar Páez Garcete, Roman Catholic bishop (b. 1937).

References

External links
 

 
2010s in Paraguay
Years of the 21st century in Paraguay
Paraguay
Paraguay